Standart is a Bulgarian newspaper founded in 1992. Chairman of the board of editors is Slavka Bozukova. The online edition has an English language section.

See also
List of newspapers in Bulgaria

External links
standardnews.com
English edition

Newspapers published in Bulgaria
Publications established in 1992